Riddim Ribbon Free is the second installment in Tapulous' new series of music games, preceded by Riddim Ribbon feat. The Black Eyed Peas. It features Like a G6 by Far East Movement as a default track. Similar to Tap Tap Revenge 3, there is an in-app store where players can buy premium tracks or redeem them with store credits.

Gameplay
Riddim Ribbon has a very similar gameplay to Riddim Ribbon feat. The Black Eyed Peas. It does not use any official remixes of the played songs, but instead plays a sound effect when the marble reaches an upper level. A new feature is introduced in which colored pebbles are collected and bonus points earned when three like-colored pebbles are connected side-by-side.

Riddim Ribbon is played by moving the iPod Touch or iPhone to turn the rolling marble and keep it on track.

Soundtracks
Riddim Ribbons track store features several premium tracks along with several free tracks as well.

Premium Tracks

See also
Riddim Ribbon feat. The Black Eyed Peas
Tapulous
Tap Tap
Tap Tap Revenge

References

2010 video games
IOS games
IOS-only games
Music video games
Tapulous games
Video games developed in the United States